The Amazing Race Asia 4 is the fourth season of The Amazing Race Asia, a reality television game show based on the American series The Amazing Race. The fourth installment of the show features several teams of two, each with a pre-existing relationship, in a race around Asia and the Pacific Rim. Production for this installment was delayed in 2009. It is also the first Amazing Race series to be filmed and broadcast in high-definition.

The season premiered on 23 September 2010 and the finale aired on 9 December 2010.

Filipino friends Richard Hardin and Richard Herrera were the winners of this season.

Production

Development and filming

The fourth season of The Amazing Race Asia was the first Amazing Race season to be broadcast in high-definition. Besides the switch to high-definition, updated on-screen graphics (similar in appearance to those introduced in season 14 of the American version) and music, were introduced. The opening intro was also updated with a new title card and tuneup in the music. Of note is the addition of the use of split-screens.

Filming took place in June 2010, with teams spotted at Invercargill Airport on 20 June 2010.

According to AXN, this season was dubbed as "Ride of a Lifetime". Allan noted that this season will travel to exotic locations and feature new challenges. This season features a first-time visit to Sri Lanka, as well as visits to far-flung areas including Invercargill, New Zealand and Legazpi, Albay, Philippines. Indonesia, a previously visited country that had not been visited by original American edition at the time until the nineteenth season one year later, was also visited this season.

Leg 5 was said to be the most expensive production to date. It featured teams riding numerous forms of transportation: airplanes, bus, passenger jeepney, carrier jeep, jet ski, and an all-terrain vehicle.

Leg 7 once again featured a double-length leg after not featuring one from the previous season. It featured two Detours and Roadblocks each, and a Virtual Pit Stop where teams were informed on their placements and that the leg was still ongoing before handing over their next clue. As such for superlegs in the previous installments, teams are not awarded a prize for coming first at the Virtual Pit Stop.

This is the first season in the Asian franchise to start and end in two different countries, starting in Kuala Lumpur, Malaysia and ending in Singapore, albeit having close proximity of the two locations. In some foreign editions, starting and ending locations are in different countries (such as Brazil, Israel, and Latin America), but not in the original American edition, which starts and ends in the same country until Season 34.

Lani Pillinger was absent in the Finish Line due to a broken collar bone.

Casting
Applications ended 31 March 2010, after a short extension due to popular demand. Semi-finalist and finalist interviews were held between March and April.

Marketing
The fourth season of The Amazing Race Asia had three official sponsors: Axiata, Caltex, and Sony. The official hotel partner was Hilton, and the series was supported by Tourism Malaysia and Mix FM.

Broadcasting
The identities of the contestants were revealed on 2 September 2010. A week before the premiere of "Racers Revealed", the episode was released on the show's official website. The first episode also premiered on the show's official website on 16 September 2010, one week before the season debut. A special recap episode was aired on 2 December 2010, a week before the season finale.

Cast
Season 4's cast included the show's first father-daughter team, as well as martial arts experts, tattooists, social workers, and musicians. Like in previous Asian editions, this season features a large number of media personalities or their relatives. Wendy was a finalist in Miss Hong Kong 2006, Nadine was Miss Indonesia Earth 2009, while Natasha was Miss South Jakarta 2007. Dimple is a Hindi soap actress who starred in the serial Aathvaan Vachan, while her friend Sunaina is an Indian TV actress, who starred in Dill Mill Gayye, as well as a movie actress who starred in the Hindi movie Kyun! Ho Gaya Na.... Manas finished runner-up as a contestant on the Indian reality-dating show Rakhi Ka Swayamwar, similar in format to The Bachelorette of the American series. Jess & Lani, as well as Richard Herrera, have appeared in numerous media and print advertisements and commercials in the Philippines. Richard Hardin is a former pro-basketball player in the Philippine Basketball Association. Claire is a prominent bar musician who plays at numerous gigs around Singapore, while Michelle was a reality TV contestant on the Singaporean series S Factor. At the ages of 21 and 22 respectively, Claire & Michelle also form the youngest team in Amazing Race Asia history.

This season featured five non-Asians, Ivan, who is from Hungary and raced with his Malaysian wife Hilda, Jacinta "Jess" James & Lani Pillinger are from Australia (though Lani is of Filipino ethnicity) and Richard (Hardin) & Richard (Herrera) are from the United States who are first generation Filipino Americans but raised in Columbus, Ohio. This was the first time that Thailand was not represented this season.

Results
The following teams participated in the season, with their relationships at the time of filming. Placements are listed in finishing order.
A  placement with a dagger indicates that the team was eliminated. 
A  placement with a double-dagger indicates that the team was the last to arrive at a pit stop in a non-elimination leg, and was marked for elimination; if the team did not place 1st in the next leg, they would receive a 30-minute penalty.
An italicised placements indicate the position of the team at the midpoint of a double leg.
A  indicates that the team won a Fast Forward.
A  indicates that the teams encountered an Intersection.
A  indicates that the team chose to use the Yield, and a  indicates the team who received it.
A  indicates that the team chose to use a U-Turn, and a  indicates the team who received it.

Notes

Episode title quotes
Episode titles are often taken from quotes made by the racers.

"Amazing Grace" – Lyric Recited from Sheet Music Clue
"Allan Is Really Good With His Poker Face" – Khairie
"I Can't Carry My Backpack" – Hilda
"You Have So Many Good Students Here" – Natasha
"I Think They're Spoiled And Not Hardworking" – Hussein
"There's A Bigger Race And It's Called Life" – Ivan
"I'm The Sheep Whisperer" – Ethan
"I Was Not Allowed To Shoot The Gun Anymore" – Jess
"I Can't Believe We Let Them Step In Front Of Us" – Richard (Hardin)
"We Don't Hate Anyone" – Richard (Hardin)
"I'm Still In Shock" – Richard (Hardin)

Prizes
Individual prizes were awarded to the first team to complete a leg
Leg 1 – A Sony PlayStation 3 and BRAVIA for each team member
Leg 2 – A Sony VAIO for each team member
Leg 3 – A vacation package worth US$3,000 to Colombo, Sri Lanka
Leg 4 – US$2,000 each
Leg 5 – A trip for two to the Philippines, US$3,500, and a helicopter ride to Legazpi Airport to be given after all teams had departed in the next leg
Leg 6 – A vacation package and a dinner for two at the Marina Bay Sands in Singapore, worth US$5,100
Leg 7:
Midpoint – A special prize of an upgrade at any Hilton hotel was awarded to Ethan & Khairie for being the fastest team to complete the Hilton bed-making challenge.
Pit Stop – A 4-day ski vacation at Niseko, Japan worth US$6,000 for the first place team at the Pit Stop
Leg 8 – A year's supply of Caltex with Techron worth US$5,000
Leg 9 – A 7-night stay at the Hilton water villa in the Maldives worth US$6,000
Leg 10 – US$100,000

Race summary

Leg 1 (Malaysia)

Airdate: 23 September 2010
Kuala Lumpur, Malaysia  (Thean Hou Temple) (Starting Line)
Gombak (Batu Caves) 
George Town, Penang (Pinang Peranakan Mansion)
George Town (Gelugor – Futsal Court)
George Town (Swettenham Pier)
 George Town (MS Star Pisces) 

In this season's first Roadblock, one team member had to ascend the stairs at the Batu Caves complex inhabited by monkeys while carrying an offering of fruit and counting the number of steps. Once at the top, they had to give their offering to a Hindu priest and provide the correct number of steps (272) to receive their next clue.

This season's first Detour was a choice between Flags or Rags. In Flags, teams had to find five flags hidden around the ship using ship lingo to receive their next clue. In Rags, one team member had to lower themselves down to clean a window on the ship, while the other had to search for and take a photo of their partner to receive their next clue.

Additional tasks
After finishing the Roadblock, teams were instructed to drive to "the Pit Stop from Episode 8 of The Amazing Race Season 16 USA version" sending them to Pinang Peranakan Mansion. Once there, they had to find "Baldwin", a piano, where their next clue was in the form of piano sheet music of the song "Amazing Grace".
At the futsal court, each team member had to take a specific number of turns defending the goal against young futsal players to receive their next clue. Teams would receive a 2-minute time penalty for each goal scored against them.
After finishing the Detour, teams were instructed to go to the 12th deck of the cruise ship to find the Pit Stop.

Leg 2 (Malaysia)

Airdate: 30 September 2010
George Town (Batu Ferringhi Beach)
 George Town (Penang International Airport) to Kota Kinabalu, Sabah (Kota Kinabalu International Airport)
Tuaran (Murut Warrior's Village)
Kota Kinabalu (Filipino Night Market)
Kota Kinabalu (Sutera Harbour Marina) 
 Tunku Abdul Rahman National Park (Sapi Island)
 Tamparuli (Kiulu River White Water Rafting)
Kota Kinabalu (Kampung Tanjung Aru) 

In this leg's Roadblock, one team member had to guide a ring through an underwater rope maze whilst using diving equipment to receive their next clue. There was a time limit to complete the task, and if racers were unable to complete within the time limit, they would incur a four-hour penalty.

This leg's Detour was a choice between Rapid Water or Rapid Fire. In Rapid Water, teams had to sail a bamboo raft down river rapids and across the river to retrieve their next clue. In Rapid Fire, both teammates had to shoot Malaysian slingshots at two targets to receive their next clue.

Additional tasks
At the Murut Warrior's Village, teams took part in a ceremony in the village which involved tribal dancing and touching a snake before receiving their next clue.
At the Filipino Night Market, teams had to eat at least a hundred chicken balls to receive their next clue. The team that ate the most number of chicken balls would have a 20-minute advantage in the next task, the Roadblock.

Leg 3 (Malaysia → Sri Lanka)

Airdate: 7 October 2010
 Kota Kinabalu (Kota Kinabalu International Airport) to Kuala Lumpur (Kuala Lumpur International Airport)
Kuala Lumpur (Axiata Telecoms Controls Centre)
 Kuala Lumpur (Kuala Lumpur International Airport) to Colombo, Sri Lanka (Bandaranaike International Airport)
Colombo (Gangaramaya Temple)
 Colombo (Pettah – St. John's Fish Market)
Nugegoda (Nugegoda Station Road – Peanut Vendor)
 Nugegoda (Trendy Connections  Garment Factory) 
Colombo (Independence Square) 

This leg's Detour was a choice between Count or Carry. In Count, teams had to count fish and give the correct amount of 1,100 fish to receive their next clue. In Carry, teams had to carry 12 blocks of ice to a market vendor across the fish market to receive their next clue.

In this leg's Roadblock, one team member had to use a professional sewing machine to properly sew fabric cuttings into a shirt to receive their next clue.

Additional tasks
At the Kuala Lumpur's Axiata Telecoms Controls Centre, teams had to look at the television screen until they found a picture of a golden Buddha and then press the company name of a telecommunications company, Dialog Telekom, located in the same country as the statue on a touchscreen computer to receive their next clue. If a wrong answer was given, teams had to wait for two minutes before they could try again.
At Gangaramaya Temple, teams had to receive a blessing from the Buddhist monk to receive their next clue.
At Nugegoda Station Road, each team member had to sell 20 bags of peanuts for Rs.15 a piece and exchange their earnings for their next clue from the vendor.

Leg 4 (Sri Lanka)

Airdate: 14 October 2010
 Colombo (Fort Railway Station) to Galle (Galle Railway Station)
Galle (Galle Fort)
Galle (Galle Bus Station) 
Galle (Galle Lighthouse) 
Galle (Dialog Service Centre)
 Galle (Galle Bus Station) to Ambalangoda (Ambalangoda Train Station – Mask Stall Vendor)
 Kalutara (Coconut Plantation or Holy Cross College)
Kalutara (Kalutara Kalido Beach) 

In this season's only Fast Forward, one team had to proceed to the Galle Bus Station, where they would discover they had to have their heads shaved at a nearby street barber. Once completed, the team would receive the Fast Forward award and a Hilton Duck, which they had to bring to the Pit Stop, and would be taken in a marked taxi to the Pit Stop.

In this leg's Roadblock, one team member had to find out the year when Sri Lanka became a sovereign state and changed its name from Ceylon to its present name (1972). The team member had to use this year as a combination (1972 → 1-9-7-2) to unlock a treasure chest, containing their next clue, located along a beach outside the Galle Lighthouse.

This leg's Detour was a choice between Coconut Course or Language Course. In Coconut Course, both team members had climb up a laddered coconut tree and traverse on a hanging rope between two coconut trees to retrieve a coconut, which they had to give to the chieftain to get their next clue. In Language Course, teams had to go to a school to learn ten Sinhalese words from a student and then correctly recite them to a teacher to receive their next clue.

Additional tasks
At the Dialog Service Centre, teams had to find a cellular phone with a message "Congratulations. Correct." from a pile of hundreds of cellular phones that displayed the message "Sorry, Try Again" to get their next clue.
At the Ambalangoda Train Station, teams had to search for a mask stall vendor, get a photo of a mask, and match it with the person wearing the same mask amidst the crowd of dancing people. Once teams found the correct person, they would receive a Hilton duck, which they had to bring to the Pit Stop, and their next clue.

Leg 5 (Sri Lanka → Philippines)

Airdate: 21 October 2010
 Colombo (Bandaranaike International Airport) to Manila, Philippines (Ninoy Aquino International Airport) 
 Manila (Ninoy Aquino International Airport) to Legazpi (Legazpi Airport) or  Pasay (Philtranco Pasay Terminal) to Legazpi (Legazpi Grand Central Terminal)
Legazpi (Ligñon Hill)
Daraga (Barangay Budiao)
Daraga (Cagsawa Ruins)  
Bacacay (Misibis Bay Resort and Casino – Misibis Bay Eco Park) 
 Bacacay (Misibis Bay Resort and Casino – Bahi Beach)
Bacacay (Misibis Bay Resort and Casino – Amphitheater) 

This leg's Detour was a choice between Jig or Pig. In Jig, teams had to don costumes and perform a traditional Ibalong dance to the satisfaction of a panel of two judges to receive their next clue. In Pig, teams would compete in a game of catch the oily pig with each team member having to catch two pigs to receive their next clue.

In this leg's Roadblock, one team member had to kayak along a flagged fish farm and search among hundreds of Amazing Race envelopes one of ten envelopes marked "Correct!", which contained their next clue.

Additional tasks
Upon arrival in Legazpi, teams had to travel by jeepney to Ligñon Hill to find their next clue.
At Barangay Budiao, teams had to ride an ATV along a marked course to the Cagsawa Ruins to find their next clue.
At the Cagsawa Ruins, teams had to participate in a traditional pukpok palayok game. One team member would be blindfolded and had to smash a clay pot containing their next clue. The other member would use a tambourine to help guide their blindfolded partner to the pot.
At the Misibis Bay Resort and Casino Eco Park, the Intersected teams had to clear up all the trash in the selected areas using the trash bag provided by Caltex to receive the next clue. After finishing the task, they were no longer Intersected.
After the Roadblock, teams had to travel by jet ski to Bahi Beach, where a jeep would take them to their next Pit Stop.

Additional note
Six teams took a bus from Manila to Legazpi, while the other two teams (Natasha & Hussein and Manas & Sahil) took a flight from Manila to Legazpi instead.

Leg 6 (Philippines → New Zealand)

Airdate: 28 October 2010
 Cagraray (Helipad) to Legazpi (Legazpi Airport)
 Legazpi (Legazpi Airport) to Invercargill, New Zealand  (Invercargill Airport)
Te Anau (Lake Te Anau)
Kingston (Pillan's Paddock) (Overnight Rest)
 Nevis River (Nevis Highwire Platform) 
Queenstown (Queenstown Events Centre)
 Queenstown (Coronet Peak) 

This leg's Detour at Nevis Highwire Platform was a choice between Plunge or Swing. Plunge was a Switchback of a Roadblock in Season 1.

In this leg's Roadblock, teams traveled to Coronet Peak, where one team member had to search for their next clue buried in the snow hill using an avalanche rescue transceiver.

Additional tasks
After arriving in Invercargill, teams had to find a camper in the parking lot with a clue instructing them to find a fisherman near Lake Te Anau with their next clue.
At Pillan's Paddock, teams had to saw five slabs from a log together and one slab each individually to receive their next clue.
At Queenstown Events Centre, teams had to score a try then kick a conversion against a team of three rugby players, some of whom were former national team players, to receive their next clue. Teams had to score in 10 attempts or serve a 10-minute penalty.
After team members finished their Roadblock, they had to ride a 4x4 truck to the top of Coronet Peak and race on foot to the Pit Stop.

Additional note
For winning the previous leg, Ethan & Khairie also won a helicopter ride to Legazpi Airport.

Leg 7 (New Zealand → Australia)

Airdates: 4 and 11 November 2010
Queenstown (Coronet Peak)
 Central Otago (Central Otago Wine Region)
Arrowtown (Arrowtown Post Office)
 Queenstown (Queenstown Airport) to Sydney, New South Wales, Australia (Sydney Airport)
Sydney (City Centre – Circular Quay)
Sydney (City Centre – Hilton Hotel)
 Sydney (Sydney Olympic Park – Sydney Circus Art School)
Sydney (City Centre – Hyde Park (Archibald Fountain)) 
 Sydney (Sydney Airport) to Brisbane, Queensland (Brisbane Airport)
Gold Coast (Southport –  Southport Indoor Pistol Club)
Gold Coast (Coomera – Dreamworld)
 Gold Coast (Pimpama – WRX Experience Rally Circuit)
Gold Coast (Broadbeach – Kurrawa Beach)
 Gold Coast (Coombabah – Farm)
Brisbane (Kangaroo Point – Kangaroo Point Park) 

This leg's first Detour was a choice between Pen or Pinot. In Pen, teams had to separate three marked sheep from a flock to another pen to receive their next clue. In Pinot, teams had to carry and fill a wine barrel with wine to receive their next clue.

In this leg's first Roadblock, one team member had to perform a flying trapeze maneuver known as a "catch" at Circus Art School to receive their next clue.

In this leg's second Roadblock, one team member, regardless of who performed the first Roadblock, had to drive a Subaru Impreza WRX one lap around a rally circuit within 102 seconds to receive their next clue.

This leg's second Detour was a choice between Bush Chucker or Bush Hunter. Before performing either Detour option, team members had to paint each other's faces much like Aboriginal Australians. In Bush Chucker, teams had to throw a boomerang and have it land within a marked circular area. In Bush Hunter, teams had to throw a hunting spear into a hay bale. After completing either Detour, one team member had to eat a live witchetty grub, an Aboriginal delicacy, before receiving their next clue.

Additional tasks
At departure, teams had to travel on foot up Coronet Peak and complete a slalom skiing course to receive their next clue.
At Arrowtown Post Office, they had to mail the videos they made during the Pit Stop to receive their next clue.
At Circular Quay, teams had to look for a man with an umbrella on his right hand and ask him "Got a clue about the weather, mate?" to receive their next clue.
At the Hilton Hotel, teams had to make a bed to Hilton's high standard within 3 minutes to receive their next clue. After four failed attempts, teams had to serve a 10-minute penalty. The quickest team would win a special prize at the Pit Stop.
At Brisbane Airport, teams had to find a Wicked camper van, a van painted with Aboriginal art, with their next clue.
At the Southport Indoor Pistol Club, each team member had to shoot a target using a .44 Magnum pistol to receive their next clue.
At Kurrawa Beach, teams had to search for a clue buried in a marked area along the beach.

Leg 8 (Australia → Indonesia)

Airdate: 18 November 2010
 Brisbane (Brisbane Airport) to Denpasar, Bali, Indonesia (Ngurah Rai International Airport)
 Denpasar (Ocean Star Boat Express) to Mataram, Lombok (Tandjoengkarang Fishing Village)
Mataram (Pura Meru )
Lingsar (Pura Lingsar)
 Mataram (Mandalika Market or Kuburan Cina)
Malaka (Malimbu Beach)
  Gili Trawangan (Blue Marlin Dive, Halik Reef, and Coral Beach)
Gili Trawangan (Sunset Point) 

This leg's Detour was a choice between Above or Beyond. In Beyond, teams had to search Kuburan Cina to locate the grave of Fam Sam Moy to find their next clue.

In this leg's Roadblock, teams had to travel by outrigger boat to Blue Marlin Dive on Gili Trawangan, where one team member had to learn to scuba dive before diving into Halik Reef to retrieve a briefcase. Then, both team members had to return to Gili Trawangan, ride a local horse carriage called a cidomo to Coral Beach, count the money in the briefcase (Rp 3,804,000), and use this number as the combination to retrieve the next clue from their Sony VAIO laptop. If teams did not enter the correct combination within three attempts, they had to wait for 10 minutes before they could enter another combination.

Additional tasks
At the Ocean Star Boat Express, teams had to sign up for a departure time for one of two boats to Lombok, with the first boat leaving at 7:00 a.m. containing two teams, and the second boat leaving at 7:30 a.m. containing three teams.
At Tandjoengkarang Fishing Village, teams had to search for their next clue, which was hidden in a boat moored along the beach.
At Pura Lingsar, teams participated in perang topat, a rice war ritual where teams were showered with rice powder by locals, before receiving their clue.

Leg 9 (Indonesia → South Korea)

Airdate: 25 November 2010
 Mataram (Selaparang Airport) to Pohang, South Korea (Pohang Airport)
Pohang (Homigot Sunrise Plaza – Hands of Harmony)
Gyeongju (Girimsa Temple)
Gyeongju (Seokguram Grotto)
 Gyeongju (Hwarang Educational Institute)
 Gyeongju (Daereungwon Tomb Complex )
Gyeongju (Gyeongju National Park – Anapji Pond) 

This leg's Detour was a choice between Bow N' Arrow or Rock N' Roll. In Bow N' Arrow, they had to choose another team's photograph as target and hit the target three times with a traditional arrow to receive their next clue. In Rock N' Roll, teams had to build a ceremonial pagoda to a certain height using rocks to receive their next clue.

In this leg's Roadblock, teams had to drive to Daereungwon Tomb Complex, where one team member had to walk through three rows of gates, only one of which in each row was correct, to receive their next clue. If the team member chose an incorrect gate, the team member would be blocked by warriors. Each team member would be given three attempts to correctly decode the warrior's code or else they had to go back to the starting point and start again.

Additional tasks
Once in Pohang, teams had to figure out that they had to go to the Hands of Harmony to find their next clue.
At Girimsa Temple, one team member had to answer five questions, and their partner had to match the answers to receive their next clue.
{|class="wikitable" style="text-align:center"
|-
!rowspan=2|Questions
!colspan=4|Answers
|-
!Claire & Michelle
!Hussein & Natasha
!Jess & Lani
!Richard & Richard
|-
!Which team makes you envy their relationship?
|Hussein & Natasha
|Ivan & Hilda
|Richard & Richard
|Richard & Richard
|-
!Which team do you dislike the most?
|Jess & Lani
|Jess & Lani
|Ethan & Khairie
|Sahil & Manas
|-
!If the race was a foursome, which team would you pair up with?
|Ethan & Khairie
|Richard & Richard
|Richard & Richard
|Dimple & Sunaina
|-
!Which team would be the first to stab you in the back?
|Jess & Lani
|Claire & Michelle
|Ethan & Khairie
|Ethan & Khairie
|-
!Which team doesn’t deserve to be in the final?
|Jess & Lani
|Jess & Lani
|Hussein & Natasha
|Jess & Lani
|-
|}
At Seokguram Grotto, teams had to ring the Reunification bell three times to receive their next clue.

Leg 10 (South Korea → Singapore)

Airdate: 9 December 2010
 Pohang (Pohang Airport) to Singapore (Changi Airport)
Singapore (Cavenagh Bridge)
Singapore (East Coast Seafood Centre – Red House Seafood Restaurant)
Singapore (Caltex Service Station)
 Singapore (Sentosa – Wave House or  G-Max Reverse Bungy)
Singapore (St James Power Station)
 Singapore (Marina Bay Sands – Tower 1 & 2)
Singapore (Marina Bay Sands – Sky Park Swimming Pool)
Singapore (Marina Bay Sands – Sky Park Observation Deck) 

This season's final Detour was a choice between Stay Up or Add Up. In Stay Up, teams had to travel to Wave House and ride an artificially-generated wave for an accumulated time of two minutes to receive their next clue. In Add Up, teams had to travel to the G-Max Reverse Bungy, where they had to add up three numbers called out by the host and get the correct sum to receive their next clue.

In this season's final Roadblock, one team member had to walk a tightrope from Tower 1 to Tower 2 of the Marina Bay Sands to retrieve their clue before walking back to Tower 1.

Additional tasks
At Cavenagh Bridge, teams had to locate the lion dancers to receive their next clue.
At Red House Seafood Restaurant, teams had to extract  of Singapore's most popular dish, chilli crab, to receive their next clue.
Teams had to search one of four Caltex stations and find a vintage car to receive their next clue. If the vintage car was no longer in the Caltex Station, teams had to proceed to a different Caltex station.
At St. James Power Station, teams had two minutes  to perform an escape illusion where one team member had to unlock themselves from handcuffs to receive their next clue.
After the Roadblock, teams had to ride a marked elevator to the Sky Park Swimming Pool, where they would be tested on their memory of the season. Once teams answered seven multiple-choice questions correctly using coloured swim rings, they would receive their final clue.

References

External links
Official website

Asia 4
2010 television seasons
Television shows filmed in Malaysia
Television shows filmed in Sri Lanka
Television shows filmed in Thailand
Television shows filmed in the Philippines
Television shows filmed in New Zealand
Television shows filmed in Australia
Television shows filmed in Indonesia
Television shows filmed in South Korea
Television shows filmed in Singapore